Vespolate is a comune (municipality) in the Province of Novara in the Italian region Piedmont, located about  northeast of Turin and about  southeast of Novara.

Vespolate borders the following municipalities: Borgolavezzaro, Confienza, Granozzo con Monticello, Nibbiola, Robbio, Terdobbiate, and Tornaco.

Demographic evolution

References

External links
 www.comune.vespolate.no.it

Cities and towns in Piedmont